Porky's Last Stand is a 1940 Warner Bros. Looney Tunes cartoon directed by Bob Clampett. The cartoon was released on January 6, 1940 according to The Indianapolis Star, and stars Porky Pig and Daffy Duck.

Plot
Porky Pig owns a restaurant with the help of his assistant, Daffy Duck. But it's trouble when the mice steal all their food. Daffy tries to get a calf for food, but he accidentally grabs a bull. The bull chases Daffy around and Daffy tries to stop him. Daffy goes to tell Porky and Porky sees that he is not kidding. So Porky and Daffy do all they can to stop him.

See also
Daffy Duck
Porky Pig
Looney Tunes and Merrie Melodies filmography

References

External links
 
Porky's Last Stand (Colorized) on the Internet Archive

1940 films
1940 animated films
Looney Tunes shorts
Warner Bros. Cartoons animated short films
Films directed by Bob Clampett
American black-and-white films
Daffy Duck films
Porky Pig films
Films set in restaurants
Vitaphone short films
Films scored by Carl Stalling
1940s Warner Bros. animated short films